Sir Albert Charles Gladstone, 5th Baronet,  (28 October 1886 – 2 March 1967) was a British businessman and rower who won a gold medal at the 1908 Summer Olympics.

Gladstone was born at Hawarden Castle, Flintshire, Wales, the eldest son of the Reverend Stephen Edward Gladstone and Annie Crosthwaite Wilson, and the grandson of the former Prime Minister, William Ewart Gladstone. As a twelve-year-old, he attended William Gladstone's state funeral. Gladstone was educated at Eton College and graduated from Christ Church, Oxford, in 1909 with a BA.

During his time at Oxford he was a member of the rowing eight and rowed for Oxford in the Boat Race on four occasions between 1906 and 1909. He was a member of the Christ Church eight that won the Grand Challenge Cup at Henley Royal Regatta in 1908. Four weeks later, he was a crew member of the Leander eight, which won the gold medal for Great Britain rowing at the 1908 Summer Olympics.

Gladstone served in World War I in Mesopotamia and Gallipoli, and was mentioned in dispatches. He was promoted to Captain in the 2nd/5th Royal Gurkha Rifles (Frontier Force), in the Indian Army Reserve, and was appointed a Member of the Order of the British Empire (MBE) in 1919.

Gladstone was a successful businessman and held many important positions being a Director of the Bank of England from 1924 to 1947 and a senior partner of Ogilvy, Gillanders & Company, East India merchants and accepting house. He was appointed Lieutenant of the City of London and was High Sheriff of the County of London in 1929. In 1935 he became Constable of Flint Castle and held the post until his death. He succeeded his cousin Sir John Evelyn Gladstone as baronet, on the latter's death on 12 February 1945.

Gladstone died in Fordingbridge, Hampshire aged 80. As he never married and had no issue, the title passed to his younger brother, Charles Andrew Gladstone, who became the 6th Baronet.

See also
List of Oxford University Boat Race crews
List of directors of the Bank of England

References

External links
 
 

1886 births
1967 deaths
Alumni of Christ Church, Oxford
Baronets in the Baronetage of the United Kingdom
English people of Scottish descent
Members of the Order of the British Empire
People educated at Eton College
Olympic gold medallists for Great Britain
Olympic rowers of Great Britain
Rowers at the 1908 Summer Olympics
Welsh male rowers
Albert Gladstone, 5th Baronet
British Indian Army officers
Deputy Lieutenants of Flintshire
High Sheriffs of the County of London
Olympic medalists in rowing
Medalists at the 1908 Summer Olympics